This is a list of public art in the London Borough of Barnet.


Arkley

Barnet Vale

Chipping Barnet

East Barnet

Finchley

Friern Barnet

Golders Green

Golders Hill Park

Hendon

Mill Hill

Monken Hadley

New Barnet

Totteridge

References

External links
 

Barnet
Barnet
Tourist attractions in the London Borough of Barnet